A list of films produced in Italy in 1996 (see 1996 in film):

References

Sources

External links
Italian films of 1996 at the Internet Movie Database

1996
Italian
Films